Cyclophora heterostigma is a moth in the  family Geometridae. It is found in Colombia.

References

Moths described in 1912
Cyclophora (moth)
Moths of South America